Edgar Noel "Ed" Bogas (born February 2, 1942), sometimes credited as Edward Bogas, is an American musician and composer whose work has been featured in films, animations, and video games.

Career
Bogas' contributions span four decades and several genres. In the 1960s, Bogas was a member of the progressive rock/psychedelic band The United States of America, and in the 1970s, he contributed the music for films by Ralph Bakshi and for television specials for the Peanuts series, succeeding Vince Guaraldi after his death in 1976. In the 1980s, he started composing music for Commodore 64 computer games such as Hardball!. He also wrote music for Children's Television Workshop (Sesame Street) games for Atari such as Oscar's Trash Race and Big Bird's Egg Catch.

In 1980, Bogas composed the score for the CBS television movie A Christmas Without Snow, in which he also appeared in the part of the accompanist to the choirmaster portrayed by John Houseman.

He continued writing music for Peanuts television specials through 1989 (This Is America, Charlie Brown), and in 1982 he also began contributing music for Garfield TV specials and series. He composed the music for all 121 half-hours of Garfield and Friends, and co-wrote all the songs for the Garfield segments with future wife Desirée Goyette for the first three seasons, and with writer Mark Evanier for the rest of the run. Also on Garfield and Friends, Bogas provided the voices of the villainous singing ants in three episodes. Goyette and Bogas have two children (Benjamin and Lily).

Bogas writes music for broadcast commercials, television, and film with his San Francisco company, Bogas Productions.

Discography

Film
Eddie Macon's Run: Composer/Arranger (additional music)
The Brave Little Toaster: Composer/Arranger (additional music)
Bon Voyage, Charlie Brown (and Don't Come Back!!): Composer
Love and the Midnight Auto Supply: Composer
Race for Your Life, Charlie Brown: Composer
He Is My Brother: Composer
Slashed Dreams: Composer
Memory of Us: Composer
Silence: Composer
Heavy Traffic: Composer w/Ray Shanklin
Fritz the Cat: Composer w/Ray Shanklin, Musical director
Payday: Composer
Black Girl: Composer w/Ray Shanklin
Payday: Music supervisor

Television
A Lot in Common: Composer
On a Collision Corse with Earth: Composer
Garfield & Friends "The Picnic Panic": Composer, Voice (The Ants)
Garfield & Friends "Another Ant Episode": Composer, Voice (The Ants)
Garfield's Thanksgiving: Composer
This Is America, Charlie Brown: Composer
Garfield's Babes and Bullets: Composer
Garfield: His 9 Lives: Composer
Garfield and Friends: Composer
A Garfield Christmas Special: Composer
Garfield in Paradise: Composer
Happy New Year, Charlie Brown!: Composer
Garfield In Disguise: Composer, Lyricist
The Romance of Betty Boop: Composer, Lyricist
Garfield in the Rough: Composer, Lyricist
It's Flashbeagle, Charlie Brown: Composer, Lyricist
Garfield on the Town: Composer
The Charlie Brown and Snoopy Show: Composer
Here Comes Garfield: Composer
No Man's Valley: Arranger, Conductor
Hot Dog: Composer
A Charlie Brown Celebration: Composer
Someday You'll Find Her, Charlie Brown: Composer
It's Magic, Charlie Brown: Composer
A Christmas Without Snow: Composer
Life Is a Circus, Charlie Brown: Composer
She's a Good Skate, Charlie Brown: Composer
It's an Adventure, Charlie Brown: Composer, Arranger, Conductor
You're the Greatest, Charlie Brown: Composer
What a Nightmare, Charlie Brown: Composer
It's Your First Kiss, Charlie Brown: Composer
Snoopy: The Musical: Conductor
You're a Good Man, Charlie Brown: Conductor
Animated Classic Showcase: Composer

Albums 
 The United States of America (album)
 David Wiffen (producer, musician, arrangements)
 Heard You Missed Me, Well I'm Back (string arrangements)
 Shebaba (musician)
 Get My Own (string arrangements)
 Fine and Mellow (string arrangements)
 Play Me c/w Lady Sings the Blues (string arrangements)
 Where I'm Coming From (arranger)
 The Brothers Four (musician, arrangements)
 Fritz the Cat (Soundtrack) (producer, musician, arrangements w/Ray Shanklin)
 Heavy Traffic (Soundtrack) (musician, arrangements w/Ray Shanklin)
 Black Girl (Soundtrack) (producer, musician, arrangements w/Ray Shanklin)
 Small Talk (string arrangements)
 Clover (producer, musician)
 Forty Niner (producer, musician)
 One Flew Over the Cuckoo's Nest (producer, arranger w/ Jack Nitzsche)
 Very Best of Tom Fogerty    (musician)
 Ace (musician, arrangements)
 Living Proof (musician)
Got My Own (arranger)

Other 
Road Riot 4WD
Psi-5 Trading Company
Law of the West
Action 52 (uncredited)
Hardball!
Studio Session (software)
Falcon F-16 (theme music composer)
Jam Session
Murder on the Mississippi
Super Tetris (with Paul Mogg)
The Music Studio (Amiga music software) (Composer of software's demo songs)
Capcom's MVP Football: Composer
Fox's Peter Pan and the Pirates 
Wordtris (Game Boy, DOS, and Macintosh versions only.)

External links

1942 births
American film score composers
American male film score composers
American male musicians
American television composers
Living people
Male television composers
Video game composers